Communist Party of Aragon (in Spanish: Partido Comunista de Aragón or PCA), was a political party in Aragon, Spain. The PCA was an orthodox splintergroup of the Communist Party of Spain (PCE).  They broke from the PCE in 1980. In 1984 PCA merged into the Communist Party of the Peoples of Spain (PCPE), and was hence known as PCA-PC.

PCA-PC no longer exists.

Elections results

References

1980 establishments in Spain
1984 disestablishments in Spain
Defunct communist parties in Spain
Political parties disestablished in 1984
Political parties established in 1980
Political parties in Aragon